Sovay is a traditional English folk song about a young woman who dresses and arms herself as a highwayman in order to test her suitor. In disguise she robs her suitor of nearly all his possessions, but even under threat of death he refuses to give up the gold ring given by Sovay, thus proving his devotion. Sovay subsequently confesses the ruse to her lover and returns his various possessions, admonishing him only that had he indeed given up the ring, she would have killed him. The name 'Sovay' is probably a corruption of 'Sophie' or 'Sylvie' – both of which appear instead in some versions of the song.

History
The Bodleian Library has a printed version called "Sylvia's Request and William's Denial" dated to 1877. 

Sabine Baring-Gould collected a song called "Lady Turned Highwayman" ("Saucy Sally on one day") in Devon in 1890. 

In 1903 Cecil Sharp collected a version which he published in "Folk Songs From Somerset" (1905). 

The wikipedia article "Highwayman" says that the last recorded robbery by a mounted highwayman was in 1831. It seems strange that the earliest versions of the song are not found until the 1870s. John Edwin Cussens wrote "A History of Hertfordshire" (3 vols 1870 - 1881). 

In it he tells the semi-fictional tale of Katherine Ferrers, a possible Lady turned highwayman. This presents a speculative source for a song
to be written at about that time.

Recordings
Cyril Tawney recorded Timothy Walsh singing "Sylvia" in 1960. 
It appeared on the album "Fair Game and Foul: The Folk Songs of Britain vol 7" in 1970. 
A.L. Lloyd recorded it as "Sovay the Female Highwayman" on "Bold sportsmen All" in 1962. 

Versions of the song have been recorded by:
 Bert Jansch
 Anne Briggs
 Martin Carthy
 Pentangle
 Ruth Barrett and Cyntia Smith
 Jah Wobble
 Keeper's Gate Band
 Cristina Crawley and Kerstein Blodig
 James Yorkston
 Bella Hardy
 Rasputina
 The Kipper Family
 Méav Ní Mhaolchatha

Andrew Bird's original song Sovay takes its title from the folk song and quotes its opening lines in its chorus.

Adaptations in other media 

In the mid-80s, the song was used as the theme to Isla St Clair's factual children's TV programme The Song and the Story, which examined the tales behind popular folk songs.

In 1993, Charles Vess and Charles de Lint created a short comic book adaptation of the song, originally published in Dark Horse Presents #75. It was reprinted in The Book of Ballads and Sagas #2 in 1995, which in turn was collected in Ballads in 1997.

In 2008, Celia Rees published Sovay, a young adult novel which follows a young lady during the time of the French Revolution. She initially becomes a highwayman to test the depth of her fiance's love for her, then to save her father and finally because she enjoys the power and freedom provided by her male attire.

The first vocal track—after a brief instrumental intro track—on Andrew Bird's 2005 album, Andrew Bird & the Mysterious Production of Eggs, is entitled 'Sovay'. The song uses an adapted form of the original's main melody, but Bird's lyric has little-to-no relation, appearing to be a rhapsody on the spiritual fight against socio-political backsliding.

The character of Sovay is also referenced in the title song of Talis Kimberley's album Archetype Cafe.

The Kate Bush song "Babooshka" in which a wife disguises herself to test her husband's loyalty was inspired by the story of Sovay.

References

External links 
 Sovay – lyrics and music (Joe-offer.com)

English folk songs